The World Motor Sport Council (WMSC) is a major organ within the Fédération Internationale de l'Automobile's governance structure. Its primary role is amending current regulations and drafting new regulations for all of international motor sport. One of the main duties of the WMSC is to allow motor sport to: Continue to develop with an emphasis on maintaining safety for the drivers and spectators, and to encourage competitive motoring innovation which adheres to environmental standards. The FIA's largest motorsport championships include the FIA Formula One World Championship, the World Endurance Championship (WEC), and the FIA World Rally Championship. The World Motor Sport Council's membership is chosen by the FIA General Assembly, which contains representatives from national automobile clubs (ASNs) throughout the world. It is one of two FIA World Councils; the other council is responsible for administrating "issues affecting the automobile in society (The World Council for Automobile Mobility and Tourism (WCAMT)). The World Motor Sport Council meets a minimum of three times a year to consider proposals from specialist FIA Commissions and subsidiaries. It has a current membership of 28 members, including the FIA President Mohammed bin Sulayem and Formula One chairman Stefano Domenicali.

Member list and Constituency (2022–term)

Governance 

The World Motor Sport Council is the most senior body in the FIA's Governance structure. The FIA and the World Council both implement a bureaucratic structure in the form of departments. Though, given the content of the World Motor Sport Council's "Terms of references" the FIA has a linear approval progression system that requires the assent of the World Motor Sport Council for any amendments.

The most crucial roles and responsibilities of the World Motor Sport Council include:

 To ensure the enforcement of the FIA statutes and, to resolve sporting questions of the general assembly.
 To finalise and ultimately approve the international sporting calendar for FIA international motor series such as Formula One, World Endurance Championship and World Rally Championship.
 To approve proposed regulations for the FIA championships.
 To administrate the finances of FIA sports given the budget of the FIA.

Source:

FIA Formula One World Championship 

The World Motor Sport Council (FIA) is the governing entity of the FIA Formula One World Championship. The Formula One World Championship is claimed to be the FIA's primary series; they have every intention to ensure that Formula One remains as the world "pinnacle of international motor sport". The World Motor Sport Council has a major role in the function and operation of Formula One. The Formula One World Championship is an important topic concerning to the FIA World Motor Sport Council and servers as an ideal case study to see the operations of the WMSC, the FIA and Formula One.

Formula One CO2 emissions 
The FIA and the World Motor Sport Council have been striving to reduce emissions from all their championships by changing championship regulations frequently. Formula One engines are some of the most efficient car engines in the world. In October 2019 the World Motor Sport Council approved the 2021 Formula One regulations which intends to enlist major reforms to the sport especially towards a more carbon-neutral status.

Formula One motor sport has one of the largest CO2 footprints of any sport. From 1950 to 1984 and 1994 to 2010, the dominant engine design philosophy of the cars was to increase horsepower and revolutions per minute, as to maximise speed with little regard to the fuel consumption. This is because for most of Formula One history Grand Prix's were conducted with refuelling permitted. Following 2010, when refuelling was re-banned, an emphasis on fuel efficiency and fuel cooling was once again considered as an integral factor in race-winning. This new meta (optimal strategy'(s)) gave rise to the implementation of TERS (thermal energy recovery system) and KERS (kinetic energy recovery system) in Formula One Grands Prix. Mourao's study shows a reasonable relationship between the period of non-refuelling and considerably less CO2 emissions per car.

In 2014, the Mercedes-Petronas World Championship winning car was estimated to achieve the same speed and covering the same distance with 1/3 of the fuel usage- in combination with the hybrid power engines utilising KERS and TERS. It was estimated that the 2014-spec engine attained a thermal efficiency of 45%, for reference the average thermal efficiency of a coal fire-power station is 33%. Thus, "the power used to drive an electric car is likely to come from a less efficient source than an F1 engine." Reducing net greenhouse gas emissions from Formula One cars is ideal for the FIA and the sport. Environmental standards are noted to be one of the key issues of the World Motor Sport Council going forward.

FIA Formula One revenue allocations 
The FIA Formula One World championship is the second biggest sporting business in the world, with an estimated annual turnover of 4.5 to 8 billion US dollars per annum. The World Motor Sport Council approved FIA F1 rule that provides 'heritage payments' to a select few Formula One teams that, serve as a "proxy for fame[d] and pass successes" of those teams for the spectators and sponsors. In 2015, Formula One teams Force India and Sauber F1 submitted a complaint to the competition directorate of the European Commission.

The complaint was regarding the "allocation of revenues from the collective sale of media rights". This resulted in the European Parliament requesting the European Commission to enact an official examination into the Formula One motor sport industry. Force India's and Sauber F1's allegations to the FIA, WMSC and FOM were:

 It is alleged that FIA, WMSC and Formula One Group "exploit their market power by imposing discriminatory contracts in the distribution of media revenue that specifically disadvantages smaller teams".
 It is alleged that this practice is synonymous to the formation of a cartel. Which promotes an "unfair competitive advantage" in both a competition and financial sense.

Budzinsk and Kock believe that this case requires significantly further investigation to correctly understand and resolve the alleged affair.

Stakeholders of Formula One 

The FIA's Formula One Group is a multinational enterprise that has major global partners and stakeholders: Including:

 Aramco
 DHL
 Emirates
 Heineken
 Pirelli
 Rolex
 Mercedes AMG
 Amazon
 Liquid Moly
 188BET
 Petronas
 Champagne Carbon
 Cyber1
 Securitas
 Hotels for Hope

Source:

The FIA, the World Motor Sport Council, stakeholders, and partners of Formula One all agreed upon the introduction of a universal team budget cap to promote impartiality in Formula One. This is particularly due to the exceedingly diverse expenditures across all F1 constructors. Additionally, it has been agreed that an overhaul of circuit design, like that of Vietnam, will create "spectacular racing and good passing moves".

At the beginning of 2017, the approval from the World Motor Sport Council was given to sell Formula One Group to Liberty Media. At the conference each sitting member of the World Motor Sport Council was able to make any inquires they may have about the details of the arrangement. According to InsiderRacing.com the approval implies that the FIA WMSC "Believes that Liberty [Media] is well positioned to ensure the continued development of its pinnacle Championship [F1]".

The FIA as a shareholder in the former company Delta Topco, thus, is thereby involved in the sale of the Formula One Group to Liberty Media. The FIA is a part of the new commercial contract with Liberty Media and remains a shareholder of Formula One Group.

Bernie Ecclestone was the former Chief executive office of the Formula One Group and thus was a sitting member of the World Motor Sport Council. Christian Horner, Red Bull Racing Team principal commented on Liberty Media's acquisition of Formula One, stating how he hopes that both Bernie Ecclestone and Liberty Media will work together to help F1 to continue to grow as a sport. In a similar way to what Ecclestone achieved in the expansion of Formula One. Such as 'racing in Singapore and Russia', and opening Formula One to the world stage through widespread wholesale of Formula One broadcasting packages.

2019 Ferrari engine controversy 

In October 2019, Formula One team, Red Bull Racing, issued a comprehensive report with concerns regarding Ferrari's 2019 engine. Ferrari had achieved six consecutive pole positions at which were achieved on circuits requiring different aerodynamic configurations. In November 2019 at the 2019 United States Grand Prix Circuit of the Americas, Austin, Texas, the FIA conducts a "full investigation" into Ferrari's engine. The FIA released a statement post-investigation saying that both Ferrari and the FIA had "reached an agreement". The FIA's initial response to the issued lead to all non-Ferrari teams to produce a mutual statement demanding that they receive "full and proper disclosure" given their "strong objection" to the settlement.

The teams stated they would "[reserve their] right to legal redress". Red Bull Racing, as one of the objecting teams has claimed that they are considering suing the FIA and the World Council for the $24 million in prize money lost to Ferrari's second placement. The FIA later addressed the legality of the Ferrari-spec 2019, stating they could not ensure the engine was "consistently legal". The FIA reneged on any further investigations on the premise that "it would be an impossibility to provide the unequivocal evidence of a breach".

At the World Motor Sport Council headquarters, there was a meeting to discuss the ongoing investigation. This meeting included Ferrari F1 Team's principle Mattia Binotto who is an active member of the World Motor Sport Council. The FIA President and FIA technical department did not provide the information requested in the complaint received by the World Motor Sport Council from the other teams. The World Motorsport Council expressed support for the FIA President and the FIA Technical Department regarding the overall management of the case. Subsequently, this caused Mercedes Formula 1 Team principal, Toto Wolff to resign from any further protesting of the non-disclosed settlement between the FIA and Ferrari. Based on the advice from Mercedes parent company,  Daimler,due to possible "damages to Formula One and the Mercedes-Petronas Formula One Team's image".

The FIA and the non-Ferrari teams are currently in disagreement over the handling of the issue, Jean Todt, FIA President, has stated that it was a complicated decision that ultimately lied on the interest of Formula One as a sport, as alternative options such as the FIA International Tribunal could take "several years" to be concluded. The World Motor Sport Council nor the FIA are permitted to release the full details of the agreement without the "consent of the defendant", claimed Todt.

FIA World Endurance Championship 
The World Motor Sport Council (FIA) is also the governing entity of the World Endurance Championship. This includes the famous Le Mans 24 hour race in France. The FIA World Motor Sport Council's function for the World Endurance Championship is similar to that of Formula One.

FIA World Rally Championship 
The FIA World Motor Sport Council deals with all administrative and regulatory issues within the World Rally Championship. Its prominence is much the same as it is for Formula One and the Endurance Champion Series.

References

External links 

 

Fédération Internationale de l'Automobile